Albert Peter Lavigne (9 October 1908 – 5 June 1962) was a Canadian businessman and politician. Lavigne was a Liberal party member of the House of Commons of Canada. He was born in Cornwall, Ontario and became a retail merchant by career.

He was first elected at the Stormont riding in a by-election on 8 November 1954, then re-elected there in the 1957 federal election. He was defeated in the 1958 election by Grant Campbell of the Progressive Conservative party after serving his only full federal term, the 23rd Canadian Parliament.

External links
 

1908 births
1962 deaths
Canadian merchants
Liberal Party of Canada MPs
Members of the House of Commons of Canada from Ontario
People from Cornwall, Ontario